Myanmar competed in the 2008 Summer Olympics, held in Beijing, People's Republic of China from August 8 to August 24, 2008. The country, also known as Burma, sent a total of six representatives to compete in five sports: athletics, swimming, archery, canoeing and rowing.

Archery

Myanmar sent archers to the Olympics for the third time, seeking the nation's first Olympic medal in the sport. The nation was given one spot in the men's individual competition through Tripartite Commission invitation; Nay Myo Aung was Myanmar's representative in the 2008 archery competition.

Athletics

Men

Women

Canoeing

Sprint

Qualification Legend: QS = Qualify to semi-final; QF = Qualify directly to final

Rowing

Women

Qualification Legend: FA=Final A (medal); FB=Final B (non-medal); FC=Final C (non-medal); FD=Final D (non-medal); FE=Final E (non-medal); FF=Final F (non-medal); SA/B=Semifinals A/B; SC/D=Semifinals C/D; SE/F=Semifinals E/F; QF=Quarterfinals; R=Repechage

Swimming

Men

See also
 Myanmar at the 2008 Summer Paralympics

References

Nations at the 2008 Summer Olympics
2008
Summer Olympics